Beta Ethniki 1997–98 complete season.

League table

Results

Top scorers

References

External links
RSSSF.org

Second level Greek football league seasons
Greece
2